The Arrernte people, sometimes referred to as the Aranda, Arunta or Arrarnta, are a group of Aboriginal Australian peoples who live in the Arrernte lands, at Mparntwe (Alice Springs) and surrounding areas of the Central Australia region of the Northern Territory. Many still speak one of the various Arrernte dialects. Some Arrernte live in other areas far from their homeland, including the major Australian cities and overseas.

Arrernte mythology and spirituality focuses on the landscape and The Dreaming. Altjira is the creator being of the Inapertwa that became all living creatures. Tjurunga are objects of religious significance.

The Arrernte Council is the representative and administrative body for the Arrernte Lands and is part of the Central Land Council.

Tourism is important to the economy of Alice Springs and surrounding communities.

Arrernte languages

"Aranda" is a simplified, Australian English approximation of the traditional pronunciation of the name of Arrernte . The ancestors of the Arrernte all spoke one or more of the many Arrernte dialects in the Arrernte group of languages. Today several are completely or nearly extinct, but a couple of them (especially Eastern or Central Arrernte) are widely spoken and taught in schools.

The Arrernte also had a highly developed sign language.

Culture
Arrernte religion and cultural life was documented thoroughly from the late nineteenth century by the Lutheran missionary Carl Strehlow, the seminal Australian anthropologists Walter Baldwin Spencer and Francis Gillen and later by T.G.H. Strehlow. he Arrernte men worked with Strehlow to document their songs and ceremonies between 1932-1974. Arrernte oral history discusses the region of Alice Springs (Mparntwe) and its environs being shaped by primordial caterpillar-beings known as Ayepe-arenye (Hyles livornicoides), Ntyarlke (Hippotion celerio), and Utnerrengatye (Coenotes eremophilae) which were ancestral to the Arrernte people. The eastern MacDonnell Ranges was formed by the Ayepe-arenye, while the western portion of the ranges was formed by Ntyarlke.

Country
Of their overall territory he wrote that they were:-
At Mount Gosse, Mount Zeil, and Mount Heughlin; on the Finke River to Idracowra, Blood Creek, Macumba, Mount Dare, and Andado, and some distance east into the sandhills of the Arunta (Simpson) Desert; northeast to Intea on the lower Hale River, thence north to Ilbala on Plenty River; west to Inilja and Hart Range, Mount Swan, Gillen Creek, Connor Well, and Narwietooma; in Central MacDonnell, James, and Ooraminna Ranges.

Sub-divisions
The name Arrernte refers to the following distinct groups (or "mobs"):
 Central Arrernte, from the township of Alice Springs only.
 Eastern Arrernte, from the Arrernte lands east of Alice Springs.
 Western Arrarnta, from the Arrernte lands west of Alice Springs, out to Mutitjulu and King's Canyon.

See also
 HMAS Arunta
 Arrernte language
 Veronica Perrule Dobson
Margaret Kemarre Turner

 Spirituality & mythology
 Altjira
 Inapertwa
 Tjurunga

Notes

Citations

Sources

External links

 Arrernte Tribal Group

Arrernte